The 1970 United States Senate election in Indiana took place on November 3, 1970. Incumbent Democratic U.S. Senator Vance Hartke was narrowly re-elected to a third term in office over Republican U.S. Representative Richard Roudebush.

General election

Candidates
Vance Hartke, incumbent U.S. Senator since 1959
Richard Roudebush, U.S. Representative from Noblesville

Results

See also 
 1970 United States Senate elections

References

Indiana
1970
1970 Indiana elections